Birdad (also Romanized as Bīrdād; also known as Bīldād and Bīrdā) is a village in Hasanabad Rural District, in the Central District of Ravansar County, Kermanshah Province, Iran. At the 2006 census, its population was 33, in 8 families.

References 

Populated places in Ravansar County